The Onge language (also spelled Öñge, Ongee, Eng, or Ung) is one of two known Ongan languages within the Andaman family. It is spoken by the Onge people in Little Andaman Island in India.

History 

In the 18th century the Onge were distributed across Little Andaman Island and the nearby islands, with some territory and camps established on Rutland Island and the southern tip of South Andaman Island. Originally restive, they were pacified by M. V. Portman in the 1890s. By the end of the 19th century they sometimes visited the South and North Brother Islands to catch sea turtles; at the time, those islands seemed to be the boundary between their territory and the range of the Great Andamanese people further north. Today, the surviving members (less than 100) are confined to two reserve camps on Little Andaman, Dugong Creek in the northeast and South Bay.

The Onge were semi-nomadic and fully dependent on hunting and gathering for food.

The Onge are one of the aboriginal peoples (adivasi) of India. Together with the other Andamanese tribes and a few other isolated groups elsewhere in Oceania, they comprise the Negrito peoples, believed to be remnants of a very early migration out of Africa.

Status
Onge used to be spoken throughout Little Andaman as well as in smaller islands to the north - and possibly in the southern tip of South Andaman island. Since the middle of the 19th century, with the arrival of the British in the Andamans, and, after Indian independence, the massive inflow of Indian settlers from the mainland, the number of Onge speakers has steadily declined, although a moderate increase has been observed in recent years. Currently, there are only 94 native speakers of Onge, confined to a single settlement in the northeast of Little Andaman island (see map below), making it an endangered language.

Demographic troubles 
The Onge are one of the least fertile people in the world. About 40% of the married couples are sterile. Onge women rarely become pregnant before the age of 28. Infant and child mortality is in the range of 40%. The Onge's net reproductive index is 0.91. The net reproductive index among the Great Andamanese is 1.40.

Population

Phonology

Vowels

There is some vowel harmony: 1p pl. prefix et- becomes [ot-] when the vowel in the next syllable is /u/, e.g. et-eɟale 'our faces' but ot-oticule 'our heads'.

Consonants

/ʔ/? (c.f. Blevins (2007:161))

Blevins (2007:160-161) states that /c, ɟ/ are actually affricates, and that retroflexes may or may not be phonemic.

/kʷ/ delabializes to /k/ before /u, o/.

Phonemic /d/ surfaces as [r] intervocalically, while arguably some words have phonemic /r/ which alternates with surface [r, l, j].

Phonotactics
Words may be monosyllabic or longer, even in content words (unlike in the closely related Jarawa). Words may begin with consonants or vowels, and maximal syllables are of the form CVC. All Onge words end in vowels, except for imperatives, e.g. kaʔ 'give'.

Consonant-final stems in Jarawa often have cognates with final e in Onge, e.g. Jarawa iŋ, Onge iŋe 'water'; Jarawa inen, Onge inene 'foreigner'; Jarawa dag, Onge dage 'coconut'. Historically these vowels must have been excrescent, as nonetymological word-final e doesn't surface when number markers are suffixed, and the definite article (-gi after etymological consonants, -i after etymological vowels, due to lenition) appears as -i after etymological e but as -gi after excrescent e, e.g. daŋe → daŋe-gi 'tree; dugout'; kue → kue-i 'pig'.

NC clusters sometimes optionally reduce to single C, e.g. ~ 'to drink' (c.f. Jarawa ).

Voiced obstruents may optionally nasalize in syllable onset when the coda is nasal, e.g. bone/mone 'resin, resin torch' (c.f. Jarawa pone 'resin, resin torch').

Morphophonemics
Clusters across morpheme boundaries simplify to homorganic sequences, including geminates, which may occur after word final -e drops, e.g. daŋe 'tree, dugout canoe' → dandena 'two canoes'; umuge 'pigeon' → umulle 'pigeons'.

References

Bibliography

Agglutinative languages
Critically endangered languages
Languages of India
Ongan languages